The 1938 Swiss Grand Prix was a Grand Prix motor race held at Bremgarten, Switzerland on 21 August 1938.

Classification

References

Swiss Grand Prix
Swiss Grand Prix
Grand Prix
August 1938 sports events